Markajmy  (German Markeim) is a village in the administrative district of Gmina Lidzbark Warmiński, within Lidzbark County, Warmian-Masurian Voivodeship, in northern Poland.

The village has an approximate population of 200.

References

Markajmy